David Hales Laidlaw is an American computer scientist. He is currently Professor of Computer Science at Brown University in Providence, Rhode Island. In 2014 he became a Fellow of the Institute of Electrical and Electronics Engineers (IEEE) for contributions to data visualization and analytics. In 2019, he was named to the IEEE Visualization Academy.

Laidlaw earned a Bachelor of Science in computer science from Brown University in 1983. He earned a Master of Science in computer science at Brown in 1985 and another masters degree at the California Institute of Technology in 1992. He completed his doctorate at Caltech in 1995 under the direction of  Alan Howard Barr.

References

External links 
 Homepage, Brown University

Fellow Members of the IEEE
Living people
Year of birth missing (living people)

Brown University faculty
Brown University alumni
California Institute of Technology alumni
American computer scientists
American electrical engineers